Thermojet might refer to one of two dis-similar jet engine designs:

 a motorjet, in which the compressor is driven by a piston engine instead of a turbine
 a valveless pulse jet